The South African smart identity card – known as a Smart ID Card – replaces the old green bar-coded identity book. Both are identity documents that serve as proof of a person's identity. This proof includes a person's photograph, their full name, their date of birth, their place of birth, and their unique identity number. The identity card securely stores the biometrics (face and fingerprint) information of the individual. The card also has space to securely store additional info, such as evidence of votes cast in local and national elections, as a means to prevent voter fraud.

Identity documents are issued to South African citizens or permanent residence permit holders who are 16 years or older. People, including spouses and children, who are working for the South African government or one of its statutory bodies outside of South Africa also qualify to receive a South African identity document. 

Despite being introduced in 2013, South African citizens born outside of South Africa, as well as permanent residents, cannot apply for the smart ID card, nor access the online services of Home Affairs (as of August 2022). For identity document-purposes, such applicants still receive only the old green ID book.

Identity documents are issued by South Africa's National Department of Home Affairs.

Despite South Africa having eleven official languages, the identity card is printed in English only.

How South Africans can apply for a Smart ID Card 

Only South African citizens born in South Africa may apply for the Smart ID card. The card is not available to South African citizens born outside of South Africa, or South African permanent residents, who need to apply instead for the old green ID book.

South African citizens born in South Africa can apply for a smart ID card in two ways: they can either apply at their local home affairs, or they can apply online at the Home Affairs e-Channel website.  

The website provides a step-by-step guide on how to apply.

People in South Africa who need help with applying for their smart ID card can call the Department of Home Affairs contact centre on +27800 601 190.

Information provided 
 Surname
 Names
 Sex
 Nationality
 Identity Number
 Date of Birth
 Country of birth
 South African citizenship status (citizen or permanent resident)
 Primary image on front of card, secondary image on back of card
 Signature

Identity Number 
Each South African ID number is a 13 digit number defined as YYMMDD SSSS CAZ, which deciphers as follows:

Barcode Data 

The back of the card contains two barcodes:

Code 39 

The one-dimensional Code 39 barcode contains:
 Identity number

PDF417 
The two-dimensional PDF417 barcode contains:
 Surname
 Names
 Sex
 Nationality
 Identity Number
 Day of Birth
 Country of Birth
 Status
 Date of Issue
 A 5-digit security number, appearing with the text 'RSA' in the multiple-layer image on the back of the card 
 A 9-digit card number appearing on the back of the card 
 The sequence 1234567890 repeated to fill up the available space in the PDF417 barcode.

See also
 National identity cards

References 
 Department of Home Affairs, Know your new Smart ID Card
 Department of Home Affairs, Identity documents

Government of South Africa
National identity cards by country
Immigration to South Africa